Lestodon is an extinct genus of megafaunal ground sloth from South America during the Pliocene to Pleistocene periods. Its fossil remains have been found in Argentina, Paraguay, Uruguay, Venezuela, Bolivia, and Brazil. It was a herbivore and primarily fed on the grasses on the South American plains and is thought to perhaps have used its semi-bipedal stance to obtain foliage from trees. Lestodon is placed as member of the Mylodontidae as indicated by the lobed form of the last tooth in the dentition.

Etymology 
The genus name Lestodon derives from the Greek for "robber tooth".

Evolutionary adaptations

Cranial 

The skeleton morphologically reflects its evolutionary history as well as its daily activities. At the caudal end, the sloth’s head connects to its neck with a class one lever. The skull is two to three orders of magnitude larger than that of living species of sloth, but the muzzle itself shows highly positive allometry to the size of the skull in comparison to modern sloths and even other megafauna of the same order Pilosa.

L. armatus had a large, blunt, and square mandible well adapted for foliage consumption. Its muzzle and dentition show a significant adaptation to this diet. The shape of the muzzle aided the ground sloth in the grazing necessary to sustain the metabolic activity of its large body; square, flat muzzles are associated with bulk feeders while pointed snouts are adaptive features of precision eaters, like the long sloping snout of modern anteaters, which are also in the same class Xenarthra (Bargo et al., 2006). The mandible, a class three lever, has a shape that indicates evolutionary pressure for strength over speed. To sustain its caloric needs with only plant matter, the sloth would have needed to be able to consume a high quantity of food with little precision.

The species would dig for its food, and would have accidentally ingested a large amount of gritty dirt and soil particulate. This gives them a large crown height, called hypsodonty, that is unsuitable for strong bite forces. While the mandibular muscles would have been well developed to support the allometrically positive jaw of L. armatus, they would have also been extremely weak (Bargo et al., 2006).

Appendicular skeleton
The pursuit of bulk plant matter is reflected in the stance, movement, and total bone structure of the ground sloth. In order to dislodge a large amount of foliage from the earth, L. armatus would have used its flat, spade-like phalanges in a hook-and-pull fashion to turn over soil and vegetation. Once again, the evolutionary design of the giant sloth favors quantity and force to quality and speed in its manus.

While the giant sloth was not fully bipedal, its forelimbs show evolutionary pressure for specialized functions over walking and could easily shift its center of gravity. The olecranon of L. armatus, for example, is longer allometrically than species whose forelimbs are primarily adapted for movement; the longer olecranon on the ulna maximizes the leverage to the moment arm of the triceps, the extensor of the forearm, but is proportionally much longer than is necessary for walking (Bargo et al., 2000). The extension of the forearm would have been very strong, but not very fast. Triceps are the primary muscle activated during the digging motion, but the odd articulation of the scapula to the humerus, and therefore the orientation of the teres major, also strengthens the force during pulling. Compared to humans, the scapula is tilted laterally, with the medial margin at a higher elevation than the acrimonion. This orientation maximizes the power of the teres major during digging. Energy storage is possible in the tendons of the triceps, produces power necessary to execute the digging behavior Lestodon armatus uses to acquire the bulk of its diet.

The spinal column of L. armatus is arranged parallel to the ground, making the angle between the femurs and the majority of the mass of the megafauna slightly more than orthogonal. On the femur, the femoral condyles have a large articulated range, which helps them to extend their posture vertically from their normal quadrupedal position.

Extant related species of the magnorder Xenarthra, like anteaters, show a similar design. All species within this order have specialized forelimbs and a center of gravity shifted caudally towards the pelvis from other quadrupeds, but rostrally when compared to fully bipedal humans. The lumbar vertebrae are said to be xenarthrous, the eponymous characteristic of the magnorder, and that means that they come into contact with each other at more points to stabilize the pelvis and the bulk of the caudally shifted mass. It would have been unable to gallop. In humans, pelvic bones are not fused together in a solid block, and this allows us greater variability of motion from side to side. Though there is reduced mobility, xenarthrous fusion provides a stable platform for digging.

Distribution 
Fossils of Lestodon have been found in:
 Luján, Pampean and Monte Hermoso Formations, Argentina
 Tarija Formation, Bolivia
 Rio Grande do Sul and São Paulo, Brazil
 Paraguay
 Dolores and Sopas Formations, Uruguay

Evidence of hunting 
Researchers working at the Arroyo del Vizcaíno site near Sauce, Uruguay suggested that Lestodon was hunted by humans about 30,000 years ago. This was based on analysis of Lestodon bones. Deep slash markings on some of them were suggested to be from the use of human stone tools. However, the date is significantly older than the oldest accepted dates for humans in South America around 15,000 years ago, and there is no evidence for stone tools at the site, making a natural origin for the marks more likely.

References 

Prehistoric sloths
Prehistoric placental genera
Pliocene xenarthrans
Pleistocene xenarthrans
Pliocene mammals of South America
Pleistocene mammals of South America
Lujanian
Ensenadan
Montehermosan
Neogene Argentina
Neogene Venezuela
Fossils of Venezuela
Pleistocene Argentina
Fossils of Argentina
Pleistocene Bolivia
Fossils of Bolivia
Pleistocene Brazil
Fossils of Brazil
Pleistocene Paraguay
Fossils of Paraguay
Pleistocene Uruguay
Fossils of Uruguay
Fossil taxa described in 1855